The Seoul World Cup Stadium, also known as Sangam Stadium, is a stadium used mostly for association football matches. The venue is located in 240, World Cup-ro, Mapo-gu, Seoul, South Korea. It was built for the 2002 FIFA World Cup and opened on November 10, 2001. It is currently the second largest stadium in South Korea after Seoul Olympic Stadium, and is the 2nd largest rectangular stadium in Asia. It was designed to represent the image of a traditional Korean kite. The stadium has a capacity of 66,704 seats, including 816 seats for VIP, 754 seats for press and 75 private Sky Box rooms, each with a capacity  for 12 to 29 persons. Due to table seats installation, capacity was reduced from 66,806 seats to 66,704 seats in February 2014. Since the World Cup it has been managed by the Seoul Metropolitan Facilities Management Corporation (SMFMC). FC Seoul moved to the Seoul World Cup Stadium in 2004.

Design 
The Seoul World Cup Stadium, the 2nd largest football-specific stadium in Asia, proudly exhibits its Korean roots. The roof has the unique shape of a traditional Korean kite, is 50 meters high, is supported by 16 masts, and covers 90% of the stadium's seats. Clad with fiberglass fabric and polycarbonate glazing its looks as if it is made out of hanji – traditional Korean paper. At nighttime, illuminations bathe the stadium in a warm, soft light, much like the light shining through the paper of a traditional Korean lamp.

Notable football events

2002 FIFA World Cup 
The Seoul World Cup Stadium was one of the venues of the 2002 FIFA World Cup, and held the following matches:

2007 FIFA U-17 World Cup 
The Seoul World Cup Stadium was one of the venues of the 2007 FIFA U-17 World Cup, and held the following matches:

2013 AFC Champions League Final 
The Seoul World Cup Stadium was the first leg venue of the 2013 AFC Champions League Final.

Tenants 
 The home of Korea Republic national football team since 2001.
 The home of K League 1 club FC Seoul since 2004.

Events 
 2004: Sangam CGV Multiplex Cinema in the World Cup Mall at the Stadium was used as the filming location for  Seoul Broadcasting System (SBS)'s drama Lovers in Paris. It was used as the cinema CSV of Baek Seung-kyung, Ki-joo's ex-wife,  played by Park Shin-yang, also where Tae-young, played by Kim Jung-eun, worked and had the pajama party.
 4th, 5th, and 6th Asia Song Festival, organised by Korea Foundation for International Culture Exchange (KOFICE), from 2007 to 2009.
 2009 Dream Concert – 10 October 2009
 2010 Dream Concert – 22 May 2010
 2011 Dream Concert – 28 May 2011
 2012 Dream Concert – 12 May 2012
 Psy's Happening Concert – 13 April 2013
 2013 Dream Concert – 11 May 2013
 2014 Dream Concert's 20th Anniversary: I Love Korea – 7 June 2014
 SM Town Live World Tour IV – 15 August 2014
 2014 League of Legends World Championship finals – 19 October 2014
 2015 I Love Korea Dream Concert – 23 May 2015
 70th anniversary of Independence I Am Korea Concert – 15 August 2015
 Sechs Kies's Reunion Concert – 14 April 2016
 2016 I Love Korea Dream Concert – 4 June 2016
 Big Bang concert 0.TO.10 – 20 August 2016
 2017 Dream Concert – 3 June 2017
 G-Dragon concert – Act III: M.O.T.T.E World Tour – 10 June 2017
 SM Town Live World Tour VI – 8 July 2017
 2018 Dream Concert – 12 May 2018
 2019 Dream Concert – 18 May 2019
 BTS pre-recorded performance for the 2020 Mnet Asian Music Awards - 6 December 2020

See also
Dongdaemun Stadium
Hyochang Stadium
Mokdong Stadium
Seoul Olympic Stadium

References

External links

 Seoul World Cup Stadium Official Website  
 Seoul World Cup Stadium official website

Football venues in South Korea
2002 FIFA World Cup stadiums in South Korea
Stadiums that have hosted a FIFA World Cup opening match
South Korea national football team
S3
Rugby union in South Korea
Sports venues in Seoul
Buildings and structures in Mapo District
Sports venues completed in 2001
2001 establishments in South Korea
Esports venues in South Korea
K League 1 stadiums